Bezymianny ( Bezymyannyyi, meaning unnamed) is an active stratovolcano in Kamchatka, Russia. Bezymianny volcano had been considered extinct until 1955. Activity started in 1955, culminating in a dramatic eruption on 30 March 1956. This eruption, similar to that of Mount St. Helens in 1980, produced a large horseshoe-shaped crater that was formed by collapse of the summit and an associated lateral blast. Subsequent episodic but ongoing lava dome growth, accompanied by intermittent explosive activity and pyroclastic flows, has largely filled the 1956 crater. The most recent eruption of lava flows occurred in February 2013.

The modern Bezymianny volcano, much smaller than its massive neighbors Kamen and Kliuchevskoi, was formed about 4700 years ago over a late-Pleistocene lava-dome complex and an ancestral volcano that was built between about 11,000–7000 years ago. There have been three periods of intensified activity in the past 3000 years.

Gallery

See also
List of volcanoes in Russia
Kamchatka Volcanic Eruption Response Team

References

External links
 
 Bezymianny Volcano live webcam
 Holocene Volcanoes in Kamchatka / Bezymianny
 Google Maps satellite image
 Information about Bezymyanny 
 For its eruptive history, go to http://www.volcano.si.edu/volcano.cfm?vn=300250 and click on its tab marked "Eruptive History".

Active volcanoes
Volcanoes of the Kamchatka Peninsula
Mountains of the Kamchatka Peninsula
Subduction volcanoes
VEI-5 volcanoes
20th-century volcanic events
Stratovolcanoes of Russia
Holocene stratovolcanoes
Holocene Asia